Pawuru Walalu (Walls Within) is a 1999 Sri Lankan Sinhala drama film directed by Prasanna Vithanage and produced by Nita Fernando for Padma Films. It stars Tony Ranasinghe, Nita Fernando and Sangeetha Weeraratne in lead roles along with Mahendra Perera and Roger Seneviratne. Music composed by Harsha Makalanda. It is the 908th Sri Lankan film in the Sinhala cinema.

The film was telecast on television for the first time through Sirasa TV on 26 January 2003 at 8.00 p.m.

Plot

Cast
 Nita Fernando as Violet
 Tony Ranasinghe as Victor Mendis
 Sangeetha Weeraratne as Lily
 Mahendra Perera as Anthony
 Damayanthi Fonseka as Daisy
 Seetha Kumari as Maggie
 Roger Seneviratne as Ranjith
 Chandra Kaluarachchi as Alice 'Nona'
 Edward Gunawardena as Edward
 Sanat Dikkumbura

References

1999 films
1990s Sinhala-language films
Films directed by Prasanna Vithanage